Tusen år till julafton is the Sveriges Television's Christmas calendar for 2015. It features Erik Haag and Lotta Lundgren as they travel through the years to discover what children have eaten throughout a time-span of a thousand years. It is a spin-off from Historieätarna.

References

External links 
 
 

2015 Swedish television series debuts
2015 Swedish television series endings
Sveriges Television's Christmas calendar